John Higgins,  (born 18 May 1975) is a Scottish professional snooker player. He has won 31 career ranking titles, placing him in third position on the all-time list of ranking event winners, behind Ronnie O'Sullivan (39) and Stephen Hendry (36). Since turning professional in 1992, he has won four World Championships, three UK Championships, and two Masters titles for a total of nine Triple Crown titles, putting him on a par with Mark Selby and behind only O'Sullivan (21), Hendry (18) and Steve Davis (15). A prolific break-builder, he has compiled over 900 century breaks and 12 maximum breaks in professional tournaments, in both cases second only to O'Sullivan (who has compiled over 1,100 centuries and 15 maximums). Higgins has achieved the world number 1 ranking position on four occasions.

In 2010, the News of the World tabloid newspaper carried out a sting operation in a hotel room in Ukraine, which claimed to show Higgins and his then-manager arranging to lose specific frames in future matches for money. Although an investigation cleared Higgins of match-fixing allegations, the WPBSA found that he had brought the sport into disrepute by failing to disclose an invitation to breach the sport's betting rules, and giving the impression of agreeing to it. Higgins was banned from professional competition for six months and fined £75,000. He returned to the tour midway through the 2010–11 season.

After winning his fourth world title in 2011, Higgins' form has become less consistent, and he has spoken frequently about his struggles with confidence. He has gone for extended periods without ranking wins. He reached three consecutive World Championship finals between 2017 and 2019, but was runner-up each time, losing to Mark Selby in 2017, Mark Williams in 2018, and Judd Trump in 2019. In the 2021–22 season, he lost five major finals, including the 2022 Tour Championship, when he lost 9–10 to Neil Robertson despite having led 9–4.

Career

Early years
Higgins turned professional in 1992 and reached the quarter-finals of the British Open during his first season on the professional tour. He rose to prominence in the 1994–95 season when, at the age of 19, he won his first ranking tournament at the Grand Prix, defeating Dave Harold 9–6 in the final. He went on to win two more ranking titles at the British Open and International Open, making him the first teenager to win three ranking events in one season, and he also reached the finals of the Welsh Open and the Masters. By the end of the season, he had moved from 51st to 11th in the world rankings. By the end of the following season, assisted by two more ranking titles and another ranking final, he had moved up to 2nd in the world. At the 1996 UK Championship final in 1996, he recovered from 4–8 down against Stephen Hendry to lead 9–8, only to lose 9–10.

In 1998, Higgins won his first World Championship, beating Jason Ferguson, Anthony Hamilton, John Parrott and Ronnie O'Sullivan, before overcoming defending champion Ken Doherty 18–12 in the final. He made a then-record 14 centuries in the tournament (an achievement that was later eclipsed by Hendry, who made 16 centuries in the 2002 World Championship). After winning the world title, Higgins became world number one for the first time in his career, ending Stephen Hendry's eight-year tenure in the top spot.

After the first world title

During the 1998–99 season, Higgins won the UK Championship and Masters with 10–6 and 10–8 defeats of Matthew Stevens and Ken Doherty, respectively, to become only the third player after Steve Davis and Stephen Hendry to hold the World, UK and Masters titles simultaneously (Mark Williams later joined this elite group). In addition, he is one of just six players to have claimed both the World and UK Championship in the same calendar year (1998); the others are Steve Davis, Stephen Hendry, John Parrott, Ronnie O'Sullivan, and Mark Selby.

Higgins remained as world number one for two years, when Mark Williams replaced him at the top of the rankings at the close of the 1999–00 season. Higgins and Williams met in the Grand Prix final in 1999, where Higgins came from 2–6 down to claim a 9–8 victory; the World Championship semi-final in 2000, where Higgins was defeated 15–17 after surrendering a 14–10 advantage in the final session; and the UK Championship final in 2000 – Higgins winning by a margin of 10–4 to earn his second UK title.

He reached the World Championship final in 2001, but lost 14–18 to Ronnie O'Sullivan. At the beginning of the 2001–02 season, Higgins became the first player to win the opening three tournaments of a season: the Champions Cup, Scottish Masters (both invitational events), and the British Open. Higgins then failed to win a major title until his fourth British Open triumph in 2004.

In the Grand Prix final in 2005, Higgins beat Ronnie O'Sullivan 9–2. In doing so, he became the first player to record four consecutive centuries in a ranking tournament, with breaks of 103, 104, 138 and 128 in frames 7 to 10. Higgins scored 494 points without reply, which was then a record (Ding Junhui managed 495 points against Stephen Hendry in the Premier League in 2007). Higgins and O'Sullivan also contested the Masters finals in 2005 and 2006. Higgins was beaten 3–10 in 2005. In 2006, he lost the first three frames, but won the next five to establish a lead after the first session. O'Sullivan levelled in the evening, and the match went to a deciding frame. On a 60 break, O'Sullivan missed a red to a baulk pocket, and Higgins made a clearance of 64 to win 10–9 to claim the title for the second time.

Second and third world titles
At the 2007 World Snooker Championship, Higgins beat Michael Holt, Fergal O'Brien, Ronnie O'Sullivan, and Stephen Maguire en route to the final. His break of 122 in the 29th frame of his semi-final against Maguire, on recovering from a deficit of 10–14 in the final session to prevail 17–15, was the 1,000th century to be made at the Crucible Theatre, Sheffield since the World Championship was first staged there in 1977. In the final, Higgins held a 12–4 advantage over Mark Selby overnight, but Selby reduced his arrears to a single frame on day two. However, at 14–13, Higgins rediscovered his form to win four consecutive frames to clinch the match 18–13 to secure his second World title at 12:54 am, the latest finish to a World final (equalled when Neil Robertson beat Graeme Dott in 2010); and nine years after his first title – the longest time span between successes since Alex Higgins (1972, 1982), and the longest at The Crucible. He regained world number one status.

As World Champion, Higgins reached the quarter-final stages in only the Welsh Open and China Open tournaments. He helped to establish, and actively promoted, the World Series of Snooker – a tour intended to bring snooker to new venues outside the traditional United Kingdom and recently developed Far East markets. He won the inaugural event in St. Helier in June 2008, beating Mark Selby 6–3 in the final. Higgins also devised a new players' union with his manager Pat Mooney, called The Snooker Players Association. He won the Grand Prix for the fourth time in 2008, beating Ryan Day 9–7 in the final in Glasgow – his first ranking tournament win on home soil.

At the 2009 World Snooker Championship, Higgins beat Michael Holt 10–5 in round one. His second-round and quarter-final matches both went the full distance of 25 frames, with Higgins overcoming 10–12 and 11–12 deficits against Jamie Cope and Mark Selby, respectively, to win 13–12. He established a 13–3 lead in the semi-final against Mark Allen and progressed 17–13 – withstanding a comeback by the Northern Irishman. Higgins recorded an 18–9 victory over Shaun Murphy in the final to become the ninth player to win the World title three or more times after Joe Davis, Fred Davis, John Pulman, John Spencer, Ray Reardon, Steve Davis, Stephen Hendry and Ronnie O'Sullivan. He joined Steve Davis, Hendry and O'Sullivan as the only players to have lifted the trophy three or more times at The Crucible. At two weeks before his 34th birthday, Higgins became the oldest player to triumph since Dennis Taylor in 1985, who was 36 years of age.

In the 2009–10 season, as reigning World Champion, he lost 5–6 on the black ball to Neil Robertson in the semi-final of the Grand Prix; and 8–10 to Ding Junhui in the final of the UK Championship, after surviving a comeback by Ronnie O'Sullivan in the semi-final when leading 8–2, to advance 9–8 the previous evening. He also defeated Neil Robertson 9–8 during the tournament. He captured the Welsh Open title by defeating Ali Carter 9–4 in the final, and ended the season as world number one despite an 11–13 loss to Steve Davis in round two of the World Championship.

Match-fixing allegations and fourth world title

Suspension
On 2 May 2010, Higgins and his manager, Pat Mooney, a World Professional Billiards and Snooker Association (WPBSA) board member, were the subject of match-fixing allegations after being filmed in a sting operation conducted by the now defunct News of the World. On 30  April, an undercover News of the World team, led by Mazher Mahmood, posing as promoters, had met Higgins and his manager in a hotel room in Kyiv under the pretence of organising a series of events linked to the World Series of Snooker. The newspaper alleged that Higgins and Mooney had agreed to lose four frames in four separate tournaments in exchange for a total payment of €300,000 and further discussed the mechanics of how to fix a frame, which tournaments and opponents to choose, and how Higgins would receive the money. Higgins was immediately suspended from the game and Mooney resigned from his position on the WPBSA board. Higgins issued a statement on the day of the allegations denying that he had ever been involved in match-fixing, and explained that he had decided to "play along" out of fears for his safety, suspecting the involvement of the Russian Mafia.

A full investigation was conducted into the allegations by David Douglas, former Metropolitan Police detective chief superintendent and head of the WPBSA's disciplinary committee. The independent tribunal that followed in September 2010, hosted by Sports Resolutions (UK) and chaired by Ian Mill QC, concurred that the WPBSA was right to conclude that Higgins had truthfully accounted for his words and actions and to withdraw the more serious charges of match-fixing, but found him guilty of "giving the impression" that he would breach betting rules, and of failing to report the approach made to him by the News of the World. Higgins received a six-month ban, backdated to the start of his suspension period, and was fined £75,000.

Return to snooker

Higgins returned to professional competition on 12 November 2010 in the Ruhr Championship – European Players Tour Championship (EPTC) event five in Hamm and went on to win the tournament beating Shaun Murphy 4–2 in the final. His winning streak continued in the Prague Classic (EPTC6) in Prague where he reached the final again, but lost 3–4 to Michael Holt.

In the 2010 UK Championship, his first tournament on British soil since his return, he reached his third final in succession. He fought back from 2–7 and 5–9 down against Mark Williams, and from 7–9 after trailing 0–61, and needing a snooker to level the match. He made a 68 break in the decider, and sealed a 10–9 victory with a sensational double on the brown. In securing his third UK title, Higgins became only the fourth player after Steve Davis, Stephen Hendry and Ronnie O'Sullivan, to win the second biggest ranking tournament in snooker three or more times. As a result of his progress in those three events, where he won 18 out of 19 matches, Higgins earned sufficient points to regain his position as world number one under the new two-year rolling ranking system after having slipped to third by missing the start of the 2010/2011 season.

Higgins lost in the first round of the Masters 4–6 against Graeme Dott, and withdrew from the German Masters after defeating Robert Milkins 5–3 in round one, to return home due to the deteriorating health of his father, who subsequently died after a long battle against cancer. A little over two weeks later, Higgins successfully defended his Welsh Open title by beating Stephen Maguire 9–6 in the final – dedicating victory to his late father. Higgins won the Hainan Classic, defeating Jamie Cope in the final. Higgins reached the quarter-final of the China Open, where he lost 2–5 against Shaun Murphy. Higgins' next tournament was the Scottish Professional Championship, where he defeated Anthony McGill 6–1 in the final.

In the World Championship, Higgins defeated Stephen Lee 10–5 in the first round, Rory McLeod 13–7 in the second round and Ronnie O'Sullivan 13–10 in the quarter-finals. On the way to a 17–14 victory over Mark Williams in the semi-finals, Higgins was heckled by an audience member who shouted out, "How do you swallow that three hundred thousand, John? ... You're a disgrace to snooker." Higgins went on to defeat Judd Trump 18–15 in the final to win his fourth world title, which prompted Steve Davis to comment "I think John Higgins is the best snooker player I've ever seen in my life". Despite the victory, Higgins lost the world number one ranking to Mark Williams.

Struggles with consistency (2011–present)

2011–12 season 
Higgins had a poor 2011–12 season, reaching only two quarter-finals of major ranking events. His season-best performance was reaching the semi-finals of the Masters, where he lost 4–6 to Shaun Murphy. Before the World Championship, he admitted that he had not practiced much throughout the season and did not feel confident about defending his title. In the first round of the tournament, he came from 6–8 down to defeat Liang Wenbo 10–9. He then played Hendry in the second round, the first time the two players had ever met in a World Championship match, but Hendry defeated the defending champion 13–4, with Higgins calling it the worst he had ever played at the Crucible. He finished the season ranked world number five.

2012–13 season 

Higgins started the 2012–13 season by winning his 25th ranking title at the Shanghai Masters, after coming back from 2–7 down to defeat Judd Trump 10–9 in the final. He made a maximum break during the final, and compiled another maximum in his second-round match against Mark Davis at the 2012 UK Championship. He won the minor-ranking Kay Suzanne Memorial Trophy, defeating Trump 4–2 in the final, and reached the final of the minor-ranking Bulgarian Open, where he lost 0–4 to Trump. However, Higgins did not enjoy sustained success for the rest of the season, reaching only one other semi-final of a major ranking event, the World Open, which he lost 2–6 to Mark Allen. He exited the World Championship in the first round, losing 6–10 to Mark Davis. Afterward, he admitted that doubts about whether he could remain at the pinnacle of the sport after 20 years as a professional had affected his form. He finished the season ranked 11th, slipping out of the top 10 for the first time in 17 seasons.

2013–14 season 
Playing with a new cue, Higgins began the 2013–14 season strongly, winning the minor-ranking Bulgarian Open with a 4–1 victory over Neil Robertson in the final, having beaten Shaun Murphy and Ronnie O'Sullivan earlier in the event. He reached the final of the season's first major ranking event, the Wuxi Classic, which he lost 7–10 to Robertson. He then lost in the early rounds at a number of minor-ranking events. He changed his cue again before defending his Shanghai Masters title, but lost 1–5 to Mark Davis in the last 16. His Kay Suzanne Memorial Cup title defence ended when he was whitewashed 0–4 by Andrew Higginson in the last 128. He lost 2–4 to Ding Junhui in the last 16 of the 2013 Indian Open, and 2–6 to Matthew Stevens in the last 32 of the 2013 International Championship. In the invitational Champion of Champions tournament, he lost 3–4 in the first round to Maguire.

Higgins switched cues yet again before the 2013 UK Championship, but continued to struggle in his matches, calling his poor form "soul-destroying." He lost 3–6 to Maguire in the last 16. Referring to Higgins's frequent changes of cue, Joe Johnson alleged in commentary that Higgins was "searching for something that is not there" and "looking for someone or something to blame" for his poor form. Higgins retaliated by claiming that players in Johnson's era had struggled to make breaks of 30 or 40 on tables with much larger pockets, and by calling Johnson one of the sport's worst commentators. After the UK Championship, he slipped to number 12 in the world rankings, having failed to progress beyond the last 16 of any tournament since the Wuxi Classic in June.

Before the Masters, Higgins revealed that he had reached the "depths of despair" after the UK Championship, after spending months "in turmoil." He also revealed that he had switched to yet another cue, had regained his tempo, and felt that he was playing better than he had in some time. He defeated Stuart Bingham 6–2 in the first round, but lost 5–6 in the quarter-finals to defending champion Selby, despite having led the match 5–3.

At the German Masters, Higgins lost 3–5 to Dominic Dale in the last 32. At the Welsh Open, he defeated Trump 4–3 in the last 16, but lost 1–5 to O'Sullivan in the quarter-finals. At the World Open, he came from 0–4 behind to defeat Trump 5–4 in the last 16, but lost 3–5 to defending champion Allen in the quarter-finals. He reached a third consecutive ranking tournament quarter-final at the Players Tour Championship Finals, but lost 1–4 to Marco Fu. At the China Open, he lost 2–5 to Ding in the last 16. He suffered a second consecutive first-round exit from the World Championship when he lost 7–10 to fellow Scot Alan McManus. After the match, Higgins described himself as a "journeyman top-16 player now," suggesting that he no longer regarded himself among the top contenders at tournaments. He ended the campaign as the world number 11, the lowest he has been at the end of the season in 19 years.

2014–15 season 
Higgins continued to struggle in the opening ranking events of the 2014–15 season, losing 4–5 to Alan McManus in the last 32 of the Wuxi Classic, 2–5 to Robert Milkins in the last 16 of the Australian Goldfields Open, and 4–5 to Ryan Day in the last 32 of the Shanghai Masters. He defended his minor-ranking Bulgarian Open title, but lost 1–4 against Judd Trump in the last 64. At the ranking International Championship, he lost 1–6 to Li Hang in the last 64. He lost 1–4 to Barry Hawkins in the first round of the Champion of Champions invitational tournament, and in the last 64 of the minor-ranking Ruhr Open, he failed to score a single point on his way to a 0–4 defeat by Marco Fu, who outscored Higgins by a cumulative total of 412 points to 0.

Higgins arrived at the 2014 UK Championship stating that he was struggling for confidence and concerned that a poor result in the championship could cost him his top-16 ranking and his place at the Masters. However, he defeated Lee Walker 6–2, Jamie Cope 6–4, and Matthew Stevens 6–2 to reach the last 16, where he lost 5–6 to fellow Scot Anthony McGill. This was enough to keep him inside the top 16, at number 14. At the Masters, he faced Mark Allen in the first round. Even though he made three century breaks, including missing the yellow when on for a maximum break, Higgins lost the match 4–6. After the match, he said that "I feel my form is steadily coming back – even when I've been losing matches I have still been gaining nuggets of confidence and I thought I played pretty well again."

In the German Masters, Higgins lost 2–5 to Peter Ebdon in the first round, but he showed improved form and confidence at the Welsh Open, where he defeated Stephen Maguire 5–1 in the quarter-finals, Luca Brecel 6–4 in the semi-finals, and Ben Woollaston 9–3 in the final to claim a fourth Welsh Open title, his first ranking title in two and a half years. Afterwards, he said that "It's great to win and get a bit of confidence back." In the last 16 of the Indian Open, he suffered a sixth consecutive defeat by Mark Davis when he lost 0–4, scoring only 38 points in the match. He lost 3–4 to Graeme Dott in the last 32 of the World Grand Prix, and lost by the same scoreline to Stephen Maguire in the last 32 of the Players Championship Grand Final. In the China Open, he reached the quarter-finals, defeating Dott and Trump along the way, but lost 4–5 to Ding Junhui. At the World Championship, Higgins won his first match at the Crucible since 2012 with a 10–5 first round victory over Robert Milkins, but he lost 9–13 to Ding Junhui in the second round, despite winning five of the first six frames.

2015–16 season 
Higgins started the 2015–16 season strongly, winning his 27th ranking title at the Australian Goldfields Open by beating Martin Gould 9–8 in the final. He won his 28th ranking title by defeating David Gilbert 10–5 in the final of the International Championship. This put Higgins level with Steve Davis in the list of ranking events won. Higgins started his quarter-final with Neil Robertson at the 2015 UK Championship by making the 600th century break of his career, but lost the match 5–6 Higgins reached the semi-finals of the China Open, but lost 5–6 after Ricky Walden made a 131 break in the deciding frame. He defeated Ryan Day 10–3 and Walden 13–8 at the World Championship, but lost 13–11 to Alan McManus in the quarter-finals, having been 11–9 ahead. He said later that he had cracked under pressure.

2016–17 season 
At the 2016 World Open, Higgins was whitewashed 0–5 by Ali Carter. He lost in the quarter-finals of both the English Open and International Championship, 5–1 to Judd Trump and 6–2 to Ding Junhui respectively. He faced Stuart Bingham in the final of the inaugural China Championship; with the scores tied at 7–7, Higgins made three successive centuries to claim the title and £200,000, which was, at the time, the highest prize awarded outside the UK. At the Champion of Champions, he defeated Ding 6–5 in the semi-finals even though Ding made four centuries in the match. Higgins defeated Ronnie O'Sullivan 10–7 in the final to win his second title in a week. In the second round of the Northern Ireland Open, he made the eighth 147 of his career and also scored breaks of 137 and 130 in a 4–1 victory over Sam Craigie. He lost a deciding frame to Selby in the quarter-finals of the UK Championship. He closed out 2016 by beating O'Sullivan 5–2 in the quarter-finals of the Scottish Open and then came back from 5–1 down to Judd Trump to win the semi-final 6–5. In the final against Marco Fu, he made three centuries in moving 4–1 ahead, but then lost eight frames in a row to lose 4–9. Higgins won the non-ranking Championship League by beating Ryan Day 3–0 in the final.

At the World Championship, Higgins reached his first world final in six years and became, at age 41, the oldest finalist in 35 years. In a rematch of the 2007 final, he faced Mark Selby. Higgins took a 10–4 lead, but then lost 12 of the next 14 frames. He recovered to 15–16 down before Selby won the two frames he required to claim the title.

2017–18 season to present 
Higgins won his 29th ranking title at the 2017 Indian Open, defeating Anthony McGill 5–1 in the final. He won his 30th ranking title at the 2018 Welsh Open, defeating Barry Hawkins 9–7 in the final; it set a new record for the most Welsh Open titles, surpassing O'Sullivan's four. Higgins also reached the final of the 2018 World Snooker Championship, but lost again to Mark Williams. At the 2019 World Snooker Championship Higgins reached the final again, only to be beaten 18–9 by Judd Trump. This was Higgins' third consecutive World Championship final and his eighth overall.

Higgins surpassed Stephen Hendry's career total of 775 centuries during the 2019 Scottish Open. He made his 775th century on 11 December during his match against Alexander Ursenbacher, and made his 776th against Jack Lisowski the following day. Higgins made his 800th career century on the first day of the 2020 Champion of Champions, although he lost the match to Ding Junhui.

In the 2020–21 season, Higgins reached his first Masters final since 2006 after beating Mark Allen, Ronnie O'Sullivan, and David Gilbert. However, he was defeated by tournament debutant Yan Bingtao 8–10 in the final. On 28 February 2021, Higgins defeated Ronnie O'Sullivan in the final of the Players Championship to claim his 31st ranking title and his first ranking title in three years. After his win, Higgins said that was "the best week of [his] snooker career" in terms of the way he played. In particular, his most impressive performance came in the quarter final against Mark Selby, Higgins outscored his opponent 546–7 in a 6–0 victory. After the match, Selby stated that, "I've never had a match where I had so few chances. John froze me out from start to finish, he played an incredible match.”

Before the beginning of the 2021/22 season, Higgins lost a significant amount of weight by taking spin classes. He weighed 15 and a half stones (217 lbs or 98.5 kg) during the 2021 World Championship, but began the new season at 12 stones (168 lbs or 76 kg). At the 2021 Northern Ireland Open, he won six consecutive frames to defeat Yan Bingtao 6–2 in the semi-finals, but lost the final 8–9 to Mark Allen, despite having led 8–6. At the 2021 English Open, Higgins came from 3–5 behind in the semi-finals to defeat O'Sullivan 6–5, but he lost the final 8–9 to Neil Robertson, despite again having led 8–6. This defeat meant that Higgins had lost six of his previous seven major finals. In his post-match comments, he expressed doubt about his ability to compete in ranking finals, stating: "The last two finals I really do think show I've not really got it at this level." Higgins went on to lose the 2021 Champion of Champions final 4–10 to Trump, and the 2021 Scottish Open final 5–9 to Luca Brecel. Even though he lost in the round of 32 at the Gibraltar Open, he won the BetVictor Series bonus of £150,000 by winning the most prize money across the series as a whole. At the 2022 Tour Championship, he came from 4–8 behind to defeat Zhao Xintong 10–9 in the quarter-finals, a victory he called one of his "best ever wins", and went on to face Robertson in the final. Higgins established a 9–4 lead, but lost his fifth major final of the season after Robertson won six consecutive frames to win 10–9. Afterwards, Higgins admitted that losing the final from a position of being five frames up with six to play would leave "real mental scars". At the 2022 World Championship, Higgins won his quarter-final match against Jack Lisowski on a deciding frame, but lost 11–17 in the semi-finals to eventual champion O'Sullivan, finishing the season ranked fifth in the world.

Personal life
Higgins married Denise in 2000; they have three children. Higgins is a supporter of Celtic F.C. and also follows English club Everton. He enjoys playing poker. In 2006, Higgins was escorted off a plane for being drunk after losing the Malta Cup final to Ken Doherty, but he became teetotal in preparation for the 2007 World Championship which he went on to win. Higgins was appointed Member of the Order of the British Empire (MBE) in the 2008 New Year Honours.

In January 2010, Higgins appeared on the BBC's Celebrity Mastermind, answering questions on his specialist subject Dallas. He finished third equal. In February of that year, Higgins and his wife Denise appeared on ITV's Mr. and Mrs. and reached the final after answering all of their questions correctly to win £30,000. They donated the money to The Dalziel Centre – a day hospice for cancer patients, based at Strathclyde Hospital in Motherwell, of which Higgins became a patron after they cared for his terminally ill father.

Miscellaneous 
In a complex mathematical study conducted at the University of Limerick, Higgins was named the highest performing snooker player from 1968 to 2020, ahead of the likes of Ronnie O'Sullivan, Mark Williams and Stephen Hendry.

Performance and rankings timeline

Career finals

Ranking finals: 55 (31 titles)

Minor-ranking finals: 6 (3 titles)

Non-ranking finals: 40 (21 titles)

Team finals: 5 (3 titles)

Pro-am finals: 1 (1 title)

Amateur finals: 5 (4 titles)

References

External links

 John Higgins at World Snooker
 Profile on snooker.org
 Profile on Global Snooker (2014 archive)

1975 births
Sportspeople from Wishaw
Living people
Scottish snooker players
Masters (snooker) champions
Members of the Order of the British Empire
UK champions (snooker)
World number one snooker players
Winners of the professional snooker world championship